Erkki Juhani Huttunen (18 May 1901 – 17 November 1956) was a Finnish architect known for his Functionalist works. He graduated from the Helsinki University of Technology in 1927.

Selected works 
SOK Toppila Mill, Oulu, 1929
City Hall, Kotka, 1934
Nakkila Church, 1937
Rajamäki Church, 1938
Hotel Seurahuone, Sortavala, Russia, 1938
Livonian Culture Centre, Dundaga, Latvia, 1939
Sokos Department Store, Helsinki, 1952

Gallery of works by Erkki Huttunen

References 

Finnish architects
Modernist architects
1901 births
1956 deaths
People from Alavus